Ochrosia tahitensis was a species of plant in the family Apocynaceae. It is endemic to Tahiti of the Society Islands, in French Polynesia.

References

tahitensis
Flora of the Society Islands
Tahiti
Flora of French Polynesia
Taxonomy articles created by Polbot

Critically endangered flora of Oceania